is a Japanese former competitive figure skater. He is the 1994 World Junior silver medalist and placed 23rd at the 1995 World Championships. He retired from competitive skating following the 2000 Four Continents Championships.

Shigematsu is a coach and choreographer who has worked with Takahito Mura, Rumi Suizu, Kento Nakamura, Risa Shoji, and Hirofumi Torii.

Results
GP: Champions Series/Grand Prix

References

Japanese male single skaters
Japanese figure skating coaches
1977 births
Living people
World Junior Figure Skating Championships medalists
Figure skaters at the 1999 Asian Winter Games
Sportspeople from Kanagawa Prefecture
Competitors at the 1997 Winter Universiade